Adam Joseph Gase (born March 29, 1978) is a former American football coach in the National Football League (NFL). He came to prominence as the offensive coordinator for the Denver Broncos from 2013 to 2014, whose offense set the NFL record for points scored in 2013 and helped the team reach Super Bowl XLVIII. Following this success, Gase served as the head coach of the Miami Dolphins from 2016 to 2018 and the New York Jets from 2019 to 2020.

Playing career
Gase played high school football for Marshall High School.

Coaching career

Michigan State
Gase began his coaching career at Michigan State while an undergraduate student. He was a student assistant to the coaching staff.

LSU
When Gase graduated from Michigan State, he followed coach Nick Saban to LSU for the 2000 season. In Gase's first season with LSU, he worked as a defensive graduate assistant and worked with recruiting. For the next two seasons, Gase worked full-time as a recruiting assistant for the Tigers. The season after Gase left, LSU won a national championship.

Detroit Lions
Gase left LSU and the college ranks to become a scouting assistant for the Detroit Lions. He was hired by Steve Mariucci. Gase worked as a scouting assistant from 2003 to 2005. He also added the role of offensive assistant for the 2005 season.

Gase stayed with the Lions under new head coach Rod Marinelli and was promoted to the team's offensive quality control coach for the 2006 season. In 2007, Mike Martz promoted Gase to the team's quarterbacks coach.

San Francisco 49ers
In 2008, Gase joined Mike Martz as an offensive assistant coach for the San Francisco 49ers as the team went 7-9.

Denver Broncos
As the offensive coordinator of the Denver Broncos under John Fox, Gase was on the sidelines during Peyton Manning's record-breaking passing season in 2013. Gase and the Broncos appeared in Super Bowl XLVIII but fell to the Seattle Seahawks in a 43–8 blowout loss. After the successful 2013 season, Gase stayed on as the offensive coordinator for the 2014 season. The season after Gase left, the Denver Broncos won Super Bowl 50.

Chicago Bears
After the Chicago Bears hired John Fox as their new head coach, Gase joined the team as Fox's offensive coordinator once again. In Gase's only season as the Bears offensive coordinator, the team finished 18th in total offense, while also recording 5,514 total net yards and 344.6 per game, while finishing 6-10.

Miami Dolphins
The Miami Dolphins announced that Gase would be the 12th head coach in franchise history on January 9, 2016. He is the first to be born after the team was founded in 1966. The Dolphins started the season with a 1–4 record, but would follow that up with a six-game winning streak. Gase finished his first season as head coach with a 10–6 record leading Miami to the playoffs for the first time since 2008.  Miami finished second in the AFC East behind the eventual Super Bowl LI champion New England Patriots. In Gase's first career playoff game as head coach, the Dolphins lost to the Pittsburgh Steelers by a score of 30–12 in the Wild Card round.

Following a promising 2016 season, the Dolphins took a step back in 2017 finishing with a 6-10.

On December 31, 2018, a day after a 42–17 loss to the Buffalo Bills to close out the 2018 season, the Dolphins fired Gase as part of their organizational changes. He finished with a 23–25 regular-season record as Miami's head coach.

New York Jets
The New York Jets announced that Gase would be the 19th head coach in the team's history on January 11, 2019. On May 15, general manager Mike Maccagnan was fired and Gase was named interim general manager; Gase retained the role until Joe Douglas was hired as the permanent general manager on June 6.

In Gase's first year, the Jets stumbled to a 1–7 record through the first eight games with starting quarterback Sam Darnold missing three games after coming down with mononucleosis, but won six of their final eight games to finish at 7–9.

In his second year, Gase and the Jets started 0–13, the worst such start in franchise history. By the Week 7 matchup against the Buffalo Bills, Gase had relieved himself of offensive play calling duties in favor of offensive coordinator Dowell Loggains. It was rumored that Gase would return to calling offensive plays for the Week 12 game against the Miami Dolphins in the 20–3 loss. At the postgame press conference, Gase did not give a straightforward answer on who was calling the plays.

In Week 13, Gase fired defensive coordinator Gregg Williams for making the "Cover 0 blitz" play call that cost the Jets the win against the Las Vegas Raiders. After starting the season 0–13, the Jets won their first game of 2020 on December 20, defeating the Los Angeles Rams 23–20. The Jets finished the season at the bottom of the AFC East with a 2–14 record, one win better than their franchise-worst 1–15 record in 1996. On January 3, 2021, hours after the team's season-ending loss against the Patriots, Gase was fired by the Jets. Gase finished his tenure in New York with a 9–23 (.281) regular season record.

Personal life
Gase is married to Jennifer Vitt, the daughter of former NFL linebacker coach Joe Vitt. The couple have three children together. Gase is a fan of the Detroit Tigers.

Head coaching record

References

External links
New York Jets bio

1978 births
Living people
Chicago Bears coaches
Coaches of American football from Michigan
Denver Broncos coaches
Detroit Lions coaches
LSU Tigers football coaches
Miami Dolphins head coaches
National Football League offensive coordinators
New York Jets executives
New York Jets head coaches
San Francisco 49ers coaches
Sportspeople from Ypsilanti, Michigan